The Circa Reproductions Morane Saulnier N, also called the Bullet, is a Canadian amateur-built aircraft that was designed by Graham Lee and produced by Circa Reproductions, of Surrey, British Columbia. The aircraft is supplied as plans for amateur construction.

The aircraft is a 90% scale replica of the First World War French Morane-Saulnier N fighter.

Design and development
The aircraft features a cable-braced mid-wing, a single-seat open cockpit, fixed conventional landing gear and a single engine in tractor configuration.

The aircraft is made from bolted-together aluminum tubing, with  plywood fuselage formers and stringers, with its flying surfaces covered in doped aircraft fabric. Standard engines recommended are the  Rotax 503 and the  Hirth 2704 two-stroke. The  Volkswagen air-cooled engine four-stroke powerplant can be used, but the requirement for a smaller diameter propeller reduces performance.

Specifications (Morane Saulnier N)

References

External links

Homebuilt aircraft
Single-engined tractor aircraft